Kid Stuff Records, also known originally as The Kid Stuff Repertory Company, was a record label founded in 1975 by Bob McAllister, Artie Kaplin, and Dick Mullen, as a children's music label. It was headquartered and located in Hollywood, Florida, United States.

The label's albums (including both read-along records and full-length LPs) were mostly tie-ins for franchises such as the DC Super Powers Collection, Care Bears, The Pink Panther, Strawberry Shortcake, Fat Albert, Garfield, E.T. The Extra-Terrestrial, and Masters of the Universe, along with video games such as Pac-Man, Missile Command, and Yars' Revenge. It also had a home video division called Kid Vid (not to be confused with NBC's Kidd Video).

Discography

LP albums

Book and record sets

KSR series

DBR series

DBC series

Just Imagine Play Kits

Tape Me Along Cassettes

Kid Vid

List of Kid Vid titles

See also 
 Book-and-record set
 List of record labels
 Golden Records
 Peter Pan Records

References 

Defunct record labels of the United States
Children's record labels